Matthew John Brittin (born 1 September 1968) is a British businessman, President of EMEA Business & Operations for Google. Since 2007, he is lead spokesperson for Google on its announcements in Europe about digital skills, as well as on issues such as controversial content and corporation tax.

Early life
Brittin was born in Walton-on-Thames, Surrey. He was educated at Hampton School and Robinson College, Cambridge where he received a bachelor's degree in 1989. He later received an MBA from London Business School with distinction in 1997.

Career
After graduating from Cambridge, Brittin worked for more than six years at Connell Wilson, a chartered surveyors firm, and became its associate director. Shortly after completing his MBA, he joined McKinsey & Co as a consultant. In 2004 he became commercial director at Trinity Mirror, owner of The Daily Mirror. Two years later he was promoted to director of strategy and digital.

Brittin joined Google in January 2007, becoming managing director of Google UK in 2009, taking over from Dennis Woodside. In September 2011 he became Google's vice-president for Northern and Central Europe. In December 2014, Google reorganized its structure in Europe and consolidated its European divisions under Brittin's management as president of EMEA Business and Operations.

Brittin sits on the boards of The Climate Group (since 2009), Media Trust (since 2010) and is a non-executive director at Sainsbury's.

Public Accounts Committee
Brittin was first called before the UK Public Accounts Committee on 12 November 2012 to explain how Google had generated billions of pounds of profit from its UK operations but paid almost no corporation tax.  On 16 May 2013 Margaret Hodge MP, the chair of the committee accused Google's UK division (managed by Brittin) of being "calculated and unethical" over its use of highly contrived and artificial distinctions to avoid paying billions of pounds in corporation tax owed by its UK operations. Brittin and Google were accused by the committee, of being "evil" for not paying its "fair amount of tax".

Brittin was called repeatedly to the committee, and claimed that Google does not "sell" in the UK, even though UK staff are paid incentives to "encourage" potential customers to spend money with Google. Reports from former staff contradicted his statements. He did not clarify his definition of "selling", but he "... admitted ’sales’ staff based in Britain are paid commission for reaching targets, further contradicting his statement. It was also revealed that Google often advertised UK-based 'sales' jobs."

In 2015, the UK Government introduced a new law intended to penalise Google and other large multinational corporations' artificial tax avoidance.

On 11 February 2016, in response to the committee asking how much he earned, Brittin claimed he did not know how much he was paid, a response that was widely ridiculed. Google are not legally obliged to tell even their shareholders what his salary is but UK daily newspaper The Guardian speculated (tongue-in-cheek) that it could be as high as £137 million a year.

Personal life
He married Katherine Betts in 1995 and has two sons (born in 1999 and 2001). In June 2011 he cycled from Land's End to John o' Groats. Brittin rowed in The Boat Race three times, from 1987 to 1989, representing the University of Cambridge. He rowed for Great Britain from 1985 to 1989, winning a bronze medal at the World Rowing Championships in 1989.

References

Living people
1968 births
People from Walton-on-Thames
Cambridge University Boat Club rowers
Olympic rowers of Great Britain
Rowers at the 1988 Summer Olympics
Stewards of Henley Royal Regatta
British chief executives
Google employees
Sainsbury's people
McKinsey & Company people